Robert Allen Wherry Jr. (born April 7, 1944 in Langley Field, Virginia) is a former judge of the United States Tax Court.

Wherry earned his Bachelor of Science from the University of Colorado and his Juris Doctor from the University of Colorado School of Law, followed by an Master of Laws in Taxation from the New York University Law School. He is a fellow and former regent of the American College of Tax Counsel and a former chairman of the Taxation Section of the Colorado Bar Association. He has served as chairman of the Small-Business Tax Committee of the Colorado Association of Commerce and Industry, as president of the Greater Denver Tax Counsel Association, is a past chairman of the Administrative Practice Committee of the American Bar Association Tax Section, a member of the Council, and a member of the Advisory Committee of the American Bar Association Section of Dispute Resolution. He is listed in The Best Lawyers in America (in tax litigation). His articles have appeared in ALI-ABA publications, The Colorado Lawyer, Tax Notes, and State Tax Notes. He is the former Colorado correspondent for State Tax Notes and has spoken at numerous tax institutes, including the University of Denver Tax Institute and Tulane University Tax Institute and American Bar Association Tax Section programs. He was an instructor in Tax Court litigation for the National Institute for Trial Advocacy.

Wherry was appointed by President George W. Bush as Judge, United States Tax Court, on April 23, 2003, for a term ending April 22, 2018. He retired from the Tax Court bench effective January 1, 2018.

References

Attribution
Material on this page was copied from the website of the United States Tax Court, which is published by a United States government agency, and is therefore in the public domain.

1944 births
Judges of the United States Tax Court
Living people
United States Article I federal judges appointed by George W. Bush
21st-century American judges
University of Colorado alumni
University of Colorado Law School alumni
New York University School of Law alumni